Myths and Legends of the Bantu is a book by Alice Werner published in 1933.  It contains legends and myths from the Bantu culture concerning the gods, the origin of mankind, the afterlife, the heroes and demigods, various creatures, real and mythical, as well as some of the great Bantu epics.

External links 
Myths and Legends of the Bantu (entire text)

1933 non-fiction books
Mythology books
Bantu people